Wild Eagle is a steel Wing Coaster built by Bolliger & Mabillard at the Dollywood amusement park in Pigeon Forge, Tennessee. It is the first of its kind in the United States and opened to the media on March 23, 2012 before opening to the public on March 24, 2012. In September 2012, the ride was voted as the best new ride of 2012 in Amusement Today's Golden Ticket Awards.

History
Speculation of Wild Eagle began in March 2011 when plans to discuss Dollywood's 2012 attraction were submitted to the Pigeon Forge Planning Commission. On March 24, 2011, those plans were approved and though city officials could not tell exactly what the plans were, some believed it looked to be a roller coaster. By early June, blue Bolliger & Mabillard roller coaster track pieces had already arrived at Dollywood. On September 4, 2011, Wild Eagle was officially announced to the public as the first wing coaster to open in the United States. On October 7, 2011, the lift hill was completed, and by the end of October 2011, the track layout was complete. The ride soft opened to the media on March 23, 2012, before officially opening to the public on March 24, 2012.

Experience

After departing from the station, the train makes a left turn leading into the  chain lift hill. Once at the top, the train drops 135 feet (41 m), reaching a top speed of 61 mph (98 km/h). The train enters a  vertical loop followed by a slight left, then into a zero-gravity roll where riders experience the feeling of weightlessness. Upon exiting the roll, the train immediately enters an immelmann loop. The train then goes through a trim brake, before entering a corkscrew, then a camelback hill which is a common way of achieving air-time on roller coasters. The train then makes a sharp left turn before making a sharp right turn which leads into the brake run. The train then makes a left turn into another set of brakes before entering the station where the next riders board the train. One cycle of the ride lasts about 2 minutes and 22 seconds.

Trains

Wild Eagle operates with two open-air steel and fiberglass trains, each with seven cars which have four seats each, with two on each side of the track for a total of 28 riders per train. Riders are restrained by flexible over-the-shoulder restraints and interlocking seat belts. Also, because the seats are on the side of the track, a cantilevered steel arm is used to support the wings. The front of each of the seven train cars is shaped to resemble an eagle with outstretched wings adding to the theme of the ride.

Track
The track is painted blue and the supports are painted tan. Both friction and magnetic brakes are used on the roller coaster to control the trains speed.

Reception
Joel Bullock from The Coaster Critic gave Wild Eagle a nine out of ten for its unique experience. He also stated that, "It’s smooth, has some fun inversions, and is meant to be a wide-reaching crowd pleaser and it fully delivered" but mentions that the restraints can become uncomfortable from time to time.

In Amusement Today's Golden Ticket Awards, the roller coaster was voted as the best new attraction for 2012 and 15th best roller steel roller coaster in the world. In Mitch Hawker's worldwide Best Roller Coaster Poll, the ride placed 87th.

See also
 2012 in amusement parks
 X-Flight, a Bolliger & Mabillard Wing Coaster at Six Flags Great America
 The Swarm, a Bolliger & Mabillard Wing Coaster at Thorpe Park

References

External links

Dollywood
Roller coasters in Tennessee
Roller coasters operated by Herschend Family Entertainment
Hypercoasters
Best New Ride winners